Sun Goes Down may refer to:

 "Sun Goes Down" (David Guetta and Showtek song), 2015
 "Sun Goes Down" (David Jordan song), 2008
 "Sun Goes Down" (Lil Nas X song), 2021
 "Sun Goes Down" (Nesian Mystik song), 2010
 "Sun Goes Down" (Robin Schulz song), 2014
 "The Sun Goes Down" (Thin Lizzy song), 1983
 "The Sun Goes Down (Living It Up)", a song by Level 42, 1983
 "Sun Goes Down", a song by Deep Purple from Bananas
 "Sun Goes Down", a song by Icona Pop from Icona Pop

See also 
 When the Sun Goes Down (disambiguation)